The 2021 FIFA Beach Soccer World Cup qualifiers for CONMEBOL was the ninth edition of the FIFA Beach Soccer World Cup qualification championship for South American men's national teams, and the third edition organized by CONMEBOL. Originally scheduled to be played in May 2021, it was eventually re-scheduled to be held from 26 June to 4 July 2021 in Rio de Janeiro, Brazil.

The tournament served to determine the three nations from CONMEBOL that qualified for the 2021 FIFA Beach Soccer World Cup in Russia.

Hosts Brazil were the defending champions.

Teams
All ten CONMEBOL member national teams entered the tournament.

Draw
The draw of the tournament was held on 4 June 2021, 18:00 PYT (UTC−4), at the CONMEBOL headquarters in Luque, Paraguay. The hosts and holders, Brazil, and the previous tournament's runners-up, Uruguay were seeded and assigned to the head of the groups A and B respectively. The remaining eight teams were split into four "pairing pots" (Paraguay–Argentina, Peru–Colombia, Chile–Ecuador, Bolivia–Venezuela) based on the final placement they reached in the previous edition of the tournament (shown in brackets).

From each pot, the first team drawn was placed into Group A and then its position within the group was drawn; the second team drawn was placed into Group B and its position within the group was also defined by draw.

The draw resulted in the following groups:

Match officials
On 8 June 2021, CONMEBOL announced a total of 18 referees appointed for the tournament.

 Mariano Romo
 Pablo Defelippi
 Jaimito Suárez
 José Luis Mendoza
 Lucas Estevão
 Luciano Andrade
 Jorge Darío Cortés
 Jorge Iván Gómez
 Erney Gonzalo Ramos
 Brando Luis Amay
 Silvio Coronel
 Gustavo Domínguez
 Alex Valdivieso
 Micke Palomino
 Christian Altez
 Aecio Fernández
 Jesús Leandro Reyes
 Luis Coy

Group stage
Each team earns three points for a win in regulation time, two points for a win in extra time, one point for a win in a penalty shoot-out, and no points for a defeat. The top two teams from each group advance to the semi-finals, while the teams in third, fourth and fifth advance to the fifth place, seventh place, and ninth place matches respectively.

All times are local, BRT (UTC−3); match reports are in Spanish.

29 June was allocated as a rest day.

Group A

Group B

Placement matches

Ninth place match

Seventh place match

Fifth place match

Knockout stage
2 July was allocated as a rest day.

Bracket

Semi-finals
Winners qualify for 2021 FIFA Beach Soccer World Cup.

Third place match
Winner qualifies for 2021 FIFA Beach Soccer World Cup.

Final

Final ranking

Qualified teams for FIFA Beach Soccer World Cup
The following three teams from CONMEBOL qualify for the 2021 FIFA Beach Soccer World Cup.

1 Bold indicates champions for that year. Italic indicates hosts for that year.

References

External links
Eliminatorias Mundial Fútbol Playa 2021, CONMEBOL.com (in Spanish)
CONMEBOL Eliminatorias al Mundial de Fútbol Playa 2021, at Beach Soccer Worldwide

CONMEBOL
2021
2021 in beach soccer
2021 in South American football
Beach soccer in Brazil